Gemellus may refer to:

 Tiberius Julius Caesar Nero Gemellus (19-37 AD), son of Drusus Julius Caesar and adopted son of Caligula;
 Tiberius Claudius Caesar Germanicus Gemellus (19-23 AD), twin brother of the previous, died as an infant;
 St. Gemellus of Ancyra (d. 362 AD), Christian martyr;
 Gemellus, a pen-name of Voltaire

Muscles
 Superior gemellus muscle, a muscle in the human body;
 Inferior gemellus muscle, a muscle in the human body.